Reinier Robbemond (born 31 January 1972) is a Dutch professional football manager and former player who played as a midfielder. He is the manager of Eerste Divisie club Willem II.

A midfielder, Robbemond's professional playing career spanned 19 years and was spent at four clubs: Dordrecht '90, Utrecht, AZ and De Graafschap. He made 412 appearances in which he scored 29 goals.

After his playing career, Robbemond embarked on a managerial career. After working as a youth coach at AZ, he had a short spell as head coach of FC Oss. He then worked as assistant and later caretaker at Willem II, before becoming an assistant at PSV under head coach Mark van Bommel.

Playing career
Born in Dordrecht, Robbemond played for ODS and SC Feyenoord in his youth. Robbemond made his debut in professional football on 8 December 1990, coming on as a substitute for Dordrecht '90 in an away match at VVV. He made more than 100 appearances for his hometown club before he left for FC Utrecht in 1996. In Utrecht, Robbemond played five seasons as a regular starter in midfield. In 2001, he moved to AZ, where he played for three seasons, but was mostly utilised as a substitute for his last two years at the club. Between 2004 and 2009, Robbemond played for De Graafschap. However, when De Graafschap suffered relegation for the second time in five years, his contract was not extended, and he announced his retirement from professional football.

Managerial career
Robbemond started working as a youth coach for AZ in the summer of 2009 shortly after announcing his retirement as a player. After training various youth teams at the club, he became the head coach of the reserve team of AZ, Jong AZ, for the 2014–15 season. Robbemond succeeded Wil Boessen as head coach of second-tier Eerste Divisie club FC Oss from the 2015–16 season. On 6 April 2016, it was announced that he would be dismissed from his position after the season, as Oss finished last in the league table. However, the club did not suffer relegation due to structural changes of the Dutch football league system. 

Robbemond signed a contract with Willem in June 2016, where he became an assistant to the then newly appointed manager Erwin van de Looi. On 8 March 2018, van de Looi announced that he would resign immediately, after supporters had urged the board to leave via a manifesto. Robbemond succeeded van de Looi as interim trainer. Willem II won the first match with Robbemond as coach 5-0 over PSV, who were first in the league table at the time. Robbemond finished the season as head coach. On 26 June 2018, it was announced that Robbemond would become manager Mark van Bommel's assistant coach at PSV, and he signed a two-year contract. Van Bommel was dismissed on 15 December 2019 due to the poor results, which meant that assistant coaches Robbemond and Jürgen Dirkx were also let go. In January 2021, he became an assistant to Patrick van Leeuwen at Maccabi Tel Aviv.

On 16 June 2021, he signed a two-year contract to become manager of De Graafschap. He succeeded the dismissed Mike Snoei. He was fired from his position on 16 March 2022 following a streak of disappointing results. 

Robbemond was appointed assistant coach to Kevin Hofland at Willem II on 4 April 2022, returning to the position after a four-year absence. Hofland was dismissed on 12 December 2022, with Robbemond becoming the caretaker manager. On 5 January 2023, Robbemond was confirmed as a permanent manager, signing a contract until mid-2024.

Statistics 

Last update: December 6, 2008

References

1972 births
Living people
Dutch footballers
FC Dordrecht players
FC Utrecht players
AZ Alkmaar players
De Graafschap players
Eredivisie players
Eerste Divisie players
TOP Oss managers
People from Heerhugowaard
Footballers from North Holland
Association football midfielders
Dutch football managers
Eerste Divisie managers
Eredivisie managers
AZ Alkmaar non-playing staff
Willem II (football club) non-playing staff
PSV Eindhoven non-playing staff
Willem II (football club) managers